Nelson Merlo (born 15 July 1983, São Paulo, Brazil) is a Brazilian racing driver. In 2005, he won the Brazilian Formula Renault season, taking a win in 6 races.

Racing career
Merlo's racing career started in 1995 in Brazilian karting, where he would stay until 2003 when he moved to the Formula São Paulo circuit. He won the championship there during 2003 and 2004.

In 2005, he moved to the Brazilian Formula Renault circuit and won the championship again, setting victory records in the process.  He tested at Paul Ricard (France) with Formula World Series 3.5.

In 2006, he moved to the South American Formula Three championship, and winning the championship in 2008.

Racing record

Career summary

 Season still in progress.

External links
Official Nelson Merlo site 

1983 births
Living people
Brazilian racing drivers
Stock Car Brasil drivers
Formula 3 Sudamericana drivers
Brazilian Formula Renault 2.0 drivers

Piquet GP drivers